Devon Seron is a Filipino actress and television personality.

Personal life
Seron grew up in Cebu, Philippines. Despite their financial issues, her parents decided to move her to an expensive private school close to their home to minimize her walking distance.  Big Brother offered to pay the remainder of her tuition so she could graduate high school. Devon was chosen among thousands of other contestants from different regions of the country to enter the PBB house. On week 6, her mother joined her inside the house disguised as a house player in return of her college scholarship funds.

Devon is very much engaged in her showbiz commitments while managing her school work to finish her degree in Business Management.

Career
Seron started as a contestant in a reality TV show dubbed as "Bubbly Promdi ng Cebu" and was voted as the Teen Big 4th Placer on the final night of Pinoy Big Brother: Teen Clash 2010. Following her success, Devon signed exclusively to be one of the members of ABS-CBN contracted talents.

After her stint in PBB, she was cast in ABS-CBN's teen variety show Shoutout!. She then was in the hit youth oriented dance-drama series Good Vibes. Devon played the role of Mariel on the 2011 remake of the TV series, Mula sa Puso.

She was also part of ABS-CBN's afternoon TV series, Angelito: Batang Ama and Angelito: Ang Bagong Yugto in 2011–2012. She then played young Bernadette on the TV series, Apoy Sa Dagat. Devon was cast as Rosario in Maria Mercedes remake topbilled by Jessy Mendiola. She played the role of Riri in Moon of Desire.

In 2016, Seron was part of It's Showtime girl group "Girl Trends" and recently left the group to focus more on her career. She had one of the lead roles in Regal Film's horror movie, "Pwera Usog" that was released on March 8, 2017.

She was chosen to play the role of Kim Soriano in the recently released movie entitled "You with Me" where she got her first lead role. She spent almost a month in South Korea to shoot this film.

In 2018 she was among the lead stars of the Regal Film's coming-of-age Teen flick “WalWal” and top billed the musical film “Bakwit Boys”.

In March 2018, Devon confirmed she didn't renew her contract with ABS-CBN and has decided to sign an exclusive contract with GMA Artist Center.

Seron is also the longest brand endorser of the Filipino phone brand, MyPhone since 2012.

Filmography

Films

Drama Series

Variety Shows

Reality Shows

Online Show

Accolades

References

External links 

1993 births
Living people
People from Cebu City
Actresses from Cebu
Cebuano television actresses
Cebuano film actresses
21st-century Cebuano actresses
ABS-CBN personalities
Star Magic
Pinoy Big Brother contestants
GMA Network personalities